The 1992 Virginia Slims of Oklahoma was a women's tennis tournament played on indoor hard courts at The Greens Country Club in Oklahoma City, Oklahoma in the United States that was part of Tier IV of the 1992 WTA Tour. It was the seventh edition of the tournament was held from February 17 through February 23, 1992. First-seeded Zina Garrison-Jackson won the singles title and earned $27,000 first-prize money.

Finals

Singles
 Zina Garrison-Jackson defeated  Lori McNeil 7–5, 3–6, 7–6(12–10)
 It was Garrison-Jackson's 1st singles title of the year and the 11th of her career.

Doubles
 Lori McNeil /  Nicole Provis defeated  Katrina Adams /  Manon Bollegraf 3–6, 6–4, 7–6(8–6)

References

External links
 ITF tournament edition details
 Tournament draws

Virginia Slims of Oklahoma
U.S. National Indoor Championships
Virginia Slims of Oklahoma
Virginia Slims of Oklahoma
Virginia Slims of Oklahoma